Atlanta is a city in Cowley County, Kansas, United States.  As of the 2020 census, the population of the city was 168.

History
Atlanta was founded in 1885. The first post office in Atlanta was established on August 14, 1885.

Geography
Atlanta is located at  (37.435287, -96.768672).

Climate
The climate in this area is characterized by hot, humid summers and generally mild to cool winters.  According to the Köppen Climate Classification system, Atlanta has a humid subtropical climate, abbreviated "Cfa" on climate maps.

Demographics

2010 census
As of the census of 2010, there were 195 people, 75 households, and 56 families living in the city. The racial makeup of the city was 83.1% White, 4.1% Native American, 4.6% from other races, and 8.2% from two or more races. Hispanic or Latino of any race were 13.3% of the population.

There were 75 households, of which 33.3% had children under the age of 18 living with them, 53.3% were married couples living together, 14.7% had a female householder with no husband present, 6.7% had a male householder with no wife present, and 25.3% were non-families. 20.0% of all households were made up of individuals, and 6.6% had someone living alone who was 65 years of age or older. The average household size was 2.60 and the average family size was 3.04.

The median age in the city was 40.4 years. 27.7% of residents were under the age of 18; 7.1% were between the ages of 18 and 24; 22.5% were from 25 to 44; 23.1% were from 45 to 64; and 19.5% were 65 years of age or older. The gender makeup of the city was 51.8% male and 48.2% female.

2000 census
As of the census of 2000, there were 255 people, 99 households, and 70 families living in the city. The racial makeup of the city was 90.20% White, 5.49% Native American, and 4.31% from two or more races. Hispanic or Latino of any race were 0.39% of the population.

There were 99 households, out of which 29.3% had children under the age of 18 living with them, 56.6% were married couples living together, 9.1% had a female householder with no husband present, and 28.3% were non-families. 28.3% of all households were made up of individuals, and 14.1% had someone living alone who was 65 years of age or older. The average household size was 2.58 and the average family size was 3.07.

In the city, the population was spread out, with 29.4% under the age of 18, 5.9% from 18 to 24, 25.9% from 25 to 44, 24.7% from 45 to 64, and 14.1% who were 65 years of age or older. The median age was 36 years. For every 100 females, there were 94.7 males. For every 100 females age 18 and over, there were 85.6 males.

The median income for a household in the city was $29,375, and the median income for a family was $36,250. Males had a median income of $31,250 versus $19,286 for females. The per capita income for the city was $12,727. About 13.4% of families and 15.5% of the population were below the poverty line, including 18.2% of those under the age of eighteen and 8.8% of those 65 or over.

Education
The community is served by Central USD 462 public school district.

Atlanta High School was closed through school unification.  The Atlanta High School mascot was Tigers.

Notable people
The Olympic-medalist runner Glenn Cunningham was born in Atlanta.

References

Further reading

External links
 Atlanta - Directory of Public Officials
 Atlanta city map, KDOT

Cities in Kansas
Cities in Cowley County, Kansas
1885 establishments in Kansas
Populated places established in 1885